Stem bromelain (SBM) (EC 3.4.22.32), a proteolytic enzyme, is a widely accepted phytotherapeutical drug member of the bromelain family of proteolytic enzymes obtained from Ananas comosus. Some of the therapeutic uses of SBM are reversible inhibition of platelet aggregation, angina pectoris, bronchitis, sinusitis, surgical traumas, thrombophlebitis, pyelonephritis and enhanced absorption of drugs, particularly of antibiotics. Its anti-metastasis and anti-inflammatory activities are apparently independent of its proteolytic activity. Although poorly understood, the diverse pleiotrophic effects of SBM seem to depend on its ability to traverse the membrane barrier, a very unusual property of this protein.

References

External links 
 

EC 3.4.22